Golden violet is a common name for several violets with yellow flowers and may refer to:

Viola aurea, native to eastern California and western Nevada
Viola douglasii, or Douglas' golden violet
Viola pedunculata, or California golden violet